is a Japanese footballer who plays for Aries FC Tokyo.

Club statistics
Updated at 21 February 2023.

References

External links

Profile at Gainare Tottori

1996 births
Living people
Association football people from Hyōgo Prefecture
Japanese footballers
J3 League players
Gainare Tottori players
Association football forwards